Yoan Baurenski (Bulgarian: Йоан Бауренски; born 21 October 2001) is a Bulgarian footballer who plays as a midfielder for Beroe.

Career
Baurenski started his career in the local Montana Stars Academy, before moving to Litex Lovеch and later in 2016 to CSKA Sofia. On 5 July 2020 he made his professional debut for CSKA in a league match against Ludogorets Razgrad. In 2020 he was loaned to Litex Lovech and in 2021 to Botev Vratsa. In January 2023, Baurenski joined Beroe.

References

External links
 

2001 births
Living people
Bulgarian footballers
Bulgaria under-21 international footballers
Bulgaria youth international footballers
PFC CSKA Sofia players
PFC Litex Lovech players
FC Botev Vratsa players
PFC Beroe Stara Zagora players
First Professional Football League (Bulgaria) players
Association football midfielders
People from Montana, Bulgaria